The Inter-Agency Standing Committee (IASC) is an inter-agency forum of United Nations and non-UN humanitarian partners founded in 1991 to strengthen humanitarian assistance. The overall objective of the IASC is to improve the delivery of humanitarian assistance to affected populations. The Committee was established following UN General Assembly Resolution 46/182 and resolution 48/57 confirmed that it should be the primary method for inter-agency coordination. The committee is chaired by the Emergency Relief Coordinator.

Members 
IASC members are:
 Food and Agriculture Organization (FAO)
The American Council for Voluntary International Action (InterAction)
 the International Council for Voluntary Agencies (ICVA)
the Representative of the United Nations Secretary General on Internally Displaced Persons
the Steering Committee for Humanitarian Response (SCHR)
UNICEF
United Nations Development Program (UNDP)
United Nations High Commissioner for Refugees (UNHCR)
United Nations Population Fund (UNFPA)
the World Bank
World Food Programme (WFP)
World Health Organization (WHO)
 United Nations Office for the Coordination of Humanitarian Affairs (OCHA)
 United Nations Development Program (UNDP)
 United Nations Population Fund (UNFPA)

Standing invitees of the IASC are:
 the International Committee of the Red Cross (ICRC)
 the International Federation of Red Cross and Red Crescent Societies (IFRC)
the International Organization for Migration

Global Clusters 

Following the recommendations of an independent Humanitarian Response Review in 2005, the cluster approach was adopted in 2005 as a way of addressing gaps and strengthening the effectiveness of humanitarian response through building partnerships. The IASC clustered similar humanitarian organizations and appointed lead agencies for each. There are 11 clusters which are humanitarian coordination mechanisms of the Inter-Agency Standing Committee:
 Camp Coordination and Camp Management
 Early Recovery
 Education
 Emergency Telecommunications
 Food Security
 Health
 Logistics
 Nutrition
 Protection
 Shelter
 Water, Sanitation and Hygiene

References

External links 

 Official website

Humanitarian aid organizations
United Nations coalitions and unofficial groups